The following lists the top 40 (end of decade) charting singles on the Australian Singles Charts, for the 1980s. These were the best charting singles in Australia for the 1980s. The source for this decade is the Kent Music Report, known from 1987 onwards as the Australian Music Report.

These charts were calculated by David Kent of the Kent Music Report / Australian Music Report and they are based on the number of weeks and position the records reached within the top 100 singles for each week.

See also
 List of top 40 albums for 1980–89 in Australia

References

Australian record charts
1980s in Australian music
Australia Top 40 Singles